SoftAtHome is a 300-employee software product company based in Colombes specializing in Digital Home Customer Experience for Home Connectivity (Access, Wi-Fi, Security), Home Applications (Video, IoT) and Data (Monitoring, Artificial Intelligence). The company’s main shareholder is the European Telecom Operator Orange, others are Etisalat, the UAE incumbent that took a 16.5% share in 2009. In October 2015, Swiss incumbent Swisscom also became a shareholder joining the "Club of Operators".

The company’s core products are Connect'ON on connectivity, Wifi'ON for smart wifi, Secure'ON for digital home security, Watch'ON for video services, Things'ON for IoT services and Eyes'ON for monitoring.

During International Broadcasting Convention (IBC) the company claimed to have surpassed a footprint of 17 million devices across 14 countries. SoftAtHome delivers only the software component so has many partnerships with hardware manufacturers like for example with Broadpeak or AirTies to deliver Over-the-top content services. Other key customers include Etisalat and O2 or Telenor.

History
SoftAtHome is a company created by Orange S.A., Thomson and Sagem in 2008.
The Telecom operator had launched TV services in 2003 and was struggling with its supplier ecosystem for triple play. Vendor lock-in was a key issue so the idea was to create a lightweight middleware layer that could host user interfaces and applications on top of it and different hardware platforms below.
SoftAtHome was the result.
In 2009 UAE incumbent Etisalat became a shareholder and client.

References

Software companies of France
2008 establishments in France